Church Hill, historically known as Minalaban, is a small village and townland in County Donegal, Ireland. The village's name is derived from its location on a small hilltop.

Church Hill has a post office, one off license, a takeaway restaurant, a tea room and two pubs. The local Catholic church is located a mile away while there is a Church of Ireland located in the village itself.

Heritage and culture
Nearby places of interest include the Colmcille Heritage Centre, the Glebe House and Gallery, Glenveagh Castle and Newmills Corn and Flax Mills.

The Churchill Fair takes place on the third weekend in July.

People
The landscape and portrait painter Derek Hill lived and worked in Churchill until 1954. He presented his house and his art collection to the Irish state in 1981.

See also
 List of populated places in Ireland
 Churchill railway station

References

Towns and villages in County Donegal
Townlands of County Donegal